Tajan may refer to:

People
 César Taján (born 1991), Colombian football player
 François Tajan (1962–2020), French auctioneer

Places
 Tajan, Hautes-Pyrénées, France
 Tajan, Gilan, Iran
 Tajan Rural District, Iran
 Tajan, South Khorasan, Iran
 Tajan (Jakljan), Croatia